139 may refer to:

 139 (number), an integer
 AD 139, a year of the Julian calendar
 139 BC, a year of the pre-Julian Roman calendar
 139 (New Jersey bus)

See also  
 139th (disambiguation)